"Smokin' On" is a song by American rappers Snoop Dogg and Wiz Khalifa, from the soundtrack Mac & Devin Go to High School. The song features fellow American rapper Juicy J. The song produced by Drumma Boy.

Music video  
The music video was released on January 17, 2012, in Snoop Dogg's channel on YouTube.

Commercial performance
On the chart dated December 31, 2011, "Smokin' On" entered the Bubbling Under Hot 100 at number 17 and number 23 on Rap Digital Songs.

Charts

References

Juicy J songs
Wiz Khalifa songs
Snoop Dogg songs
Songs written by Juicy J
Songs written by Snoop Dogg
2011 songs